Ladders, Inc. is a United States-based company providing career news, advice, and tools and an online job search service. Their search service only lists vetted job offers with annual salaries of $100,000 or more.

History
Ladders, originally named UpLadder, was founded in July 2003 by current CEO Marc Cenedella to fill a perceived void in the executive online job-seeking market.

In 2009, Ladders was the recipient of a Webby Award in the employment category.

On April 25, 2017, the company launched Ladders News, a newsroom of about 10 that operates independently of the main company to produce daily journalism about the way work is changing around the world.

In 2017, Comscore data from January to May 2017 revealed Ladders, Inc., to be the fastest-growing jobs site in the U.S., based on sites with more than 1 million visitors and showing over 77 percent growth within the published time period

On March 6, 2020, Ladders, Inc., was featured in a Washington Post article highlighting the decision of CEO Marc Cenedella to proactively put the company in a simulated COVID-19 lockdown. All employees were required to work remotely from their homes and apartments, in training for what was at the time only a potential future requirement for businesses in New York City.

Operations and business model
Ladders is headquartered in New York City, New York.

Ladders seeks to make its listings more useful to employers seeking executive personnel by utilizing a reverse business model that caters to the high-end job seeker.

It charges employees and job seekers a subscription fee, and it is continually adding new content and features for subscribers.

Although usually referred to as a paid service, Ladders utilizes a broader business model:

 Basic membership: Users sign up with Ladders and receive access to the company's search engine, which targets jobs based on information provided by the user during sign up; and based on further updates and information provided by the user after sign up. Basic users gain full access to a daily inbox delivery of the Ladders News product, career resources, job applications limited to jobs marked "Apply for Free" that appear in search results, expert advice, business leadership interviews and career insights.
 Premium membership: Paid subscribers gain full access to job applications appearing in search results, a series of features exclusive to premium membership, and exclusive discounts and offers.

Casual site visitors have access to job search resources, including 73 downloadable, job-specific, resume example templates, a resume review tool, company information search, and career advice.

Membership networking and job referrals among all members is encouraged through available features.

Ladders News
On April 25, 2017, the company launched Ladders News, a newsroom that operates independently of the main company. Ladders News produces daily journalism about work-related topics and topics related to the future of work such as remote work, economic changes, and millennials in the workplace.

References

External links
 Official site

Employment websites in the United States
Internet properties established in 2003
Privately held companies based in New York City
2003 establishments in New York City